Navarre and La Rioja are relatively small regions bordered by Aragon and the Basque Autonomous Community.  For this reason, they share much of the music found in those two regions.  The jota  is common in these two regions.

Navarre and La Rioja
Navarre music
Riojan music